The Experiment is the debut studio album by Australian electronic band Art vs. Science. The album was released on 25 February 2011 and debuted at number 2 on the ARIA Albums Chart. At the J Awards of 2011, the album was nominated for Australian Album of the Year. At the ARIA Music Awards of 2011, it won the Best Independent Release.

Reception

Rolling Stone awarded the album 4 out of 5 stars, saying that the "debut album from festival favourites perfectly captures their intense, slightly crazy live spirit".

The Vine praised the band and the album, saying its "packed from top to toe with fist-pumping, bass-throbbing anthems, the cheek of Art vs. Science might be the only thing saving the kids from utter blandness".

Mess and Noise gave the record a poor review saying, "The album could be easily dismissed as a one-note act making hay while the sun still shines on their blissfully brainless patch of land".

The Daily Telegraph proclaimed "this is Australian pop music to be proud of".

Australian street press was unified in its praise of the album, with The Brag, Drum Media, Beat and Time Off all awarding the band 4 out of 5 and Album of the Week status.

Track listing

Personnel 

Credits:
Art vs. Science
 Jim Finn: synthesisers, vocals
 Dan McNamee: guitar, vocals, synthesisers
 Dan Williams: drums, vocals

Recording
 Producer: Art vs. Science, Berkfinger (Simon Berckelman, tracks: 4, 5, 10, 13), Eric J. Dubowsky (track 13), Magoo (Lachlan Goold, tracks: 1, 2, 3, 6, 8, 9, 12)
 Mixer: Adrian Bushby

Charts

Release history

References

2011 albums
ARIA Award-winning albums
Art vs. Science albums